Iraia is a former municipality in Arcadia, Peloponnese, Greece. Since the 2011 local government reform it became a municipal unit of the municipality of Gortynia. The municipal unit has an area of 144.002 km2. It consists of 27 villages. Population 1,552 (2011). The seat of the municipality was in Paloumpa. The municipality is named after the ancient Arcadian city of Heraia. The region was known in recent times for the construction workers (mastori) who came from the villages of Servos and Lyssarea. Pausanias describes the ancient cities of Heraia and Melaineai and their buildings. An excavation near Lyssarea uncovered buildings, mosaics, as well as gold and silver coins.

Notable people 

The village of Loutra Iraias is the birthplace of the film-maker Constantinos Gavras (Costa-Gavras).

References

External links 
History of Irea (in Greek)
N. I. Kostaras's talk about the history of Irea (in Greek)
Site of Lyssarea

Populated places in Arcadia, Peloponnese